The Department of Services and Property was an Australian government department that existed between December 1972 and October 1975.

History
The Department was established under the Whitlam Government; at the time people commented with amazement that the first new department created by the Whitlam Government in Australia was the Department of Property.

Scope
Information about the department's functions and government funding allocation could be found in the Administrative Arrangements Orders, the annual Portfolio Budget Statements and in the Department's annual reports.

At its creation the Department was responsible for the following:
Elections and referendums 
Provision of accommodation, staff and other facilities for members of the Parliament other than in Parliament House 
Acquisition and leasing of land and property in Australia of elsewhere for Commonwealth purposes management and disposal of property so acquired of leased. 
Land, engineering and topographical surveys for Commonwealth  purposes.

Structure
The Department was an Australian Public Service department, staffed by officials who were responsible to the Minister for Services and Property, Fred Daly.

References

Australia, Services and Property
Services and Property